Ian Phillip Rickuss (born 27 July 1954) is an Australian politician. Born in Brisbane, he was a bank clerk and horticulturist before entering politics. In 2004, he was elected to the Legislative Assembly of Queensland as the National Party member for Lockyer, defeating the sitting member, One Nation leader Bill Flynn. Rickuss was appointed Opposition Whip on 1 July 2006. In 2008, he joined the Liberal National Party when the Liberal Party and National Party merged in Queensland.

Rickuss survived a pre-selection challenge in 2011.

He retired at the 2017 election.

Rickuss is married to Ann and has two sons, Luke and Joel.

References

1954 births
Living people
Liberal National Party of Queensland politicians
National Party of Australia members of the Parliament of Queensland
Members of the Queensland Legislative Assembly
21st-century Australian politicians